Hejdeby Church is a medieval church in Hejdeby on the Swedish island of Gotland. The church was built in stages during the 13th century, and contains medieval muralsfrom two different periods. Hejdeby Church is part of the Diocese of Visby within the Church of Sweden.

History and architecture
The church was built in the 13th century, the choir and nave first (in late Romanesque style) and the tower last (showing early Gothic influences).

The interior of the church is richly decorated with medieval murals. These date from two periods: the oldest are from the 13th century and depict apostles, the crowning of Mary, and various saints. The other set of murals date from the 15th century and depict scenes from the Passion of Christ. The church also has a triumphal cross dating from the early 13th century, a medieval baptismal font complete with its richly carved wooden lid, and an unusual medieval wooden bench. Other original furnishings are now in a museum in Visby.

References

Further reading

External links
Official site (in Swedish)

Romanesque architecture in Sweden
Gothic architecture in Sweden
Churches in Gotland County
Churches in the Diocese of Visby
Church frescos in Sweden
Churches converted from the Roman Catholic Church to the Church of Sweden